Young-min is a Korean unisex given name. Its meaning depends on the hanja used to write each syllable of the name. There are 34 hanja with the reading "young" and 27 hanja with the reading "min" on the South Korean government's official list of hanja which may be registered for use in given names.

Notable people with the name include:

Entertainers
Tim (singer) (born Hwang Young-min, 1981), American singer of Korean descent
Aron (singer) (born Aaron Young-min Kwak, 1993), American singer of Korean descent, member of NU'EST
Lim Young-min (born 1995), South Korean singer, former member of AB6IX and MXM
Jo Young-min (born 1995), South Korean singer, member of Boyfriend
Romin (born Choi Young-min, 2001), South Korean singer, member of E'LAST

Sportspeople
Lee Young-min (1905–1954), Korean football and baseball player
Lee Young-min (footballer, born 1973), South Korean football manager and former defender (K-League Challenge)
Hyun Young-min (born 1979), South Korean football fullback and wing (K-League Classic)
Kwon Young-min (born 1980), South Korean volleyball player, gold medalist in volleyball at the 2002 Asian Games
Ko Young-min (born 1984), South Korean baseball second baseman
Kim Young-min (sport shooter) (born 1985), South Korean sport shooter
Kim Se-hyun (born Kim Young-min, 1987), South Korean baseball pitcher

Other
Edward Young-min Kwon (born 1972), South Korean celebrity chef

Fictional characters
Kim Young-min, in 1990 South Korean film My Love, My Bride
Ji Young-min, in 2008 South Korean film The Chaser

See also
List of Korean given names

References

Korean unisex given names